Val Abbey (Abbey of St Mary of Val) (Abbaye Notre-Dame du Val) was a Cistercian abbey in Mériel and Villiers-Adam in Val-d’Oise,  north of Paris. It was the oldest Cistercian foundation in Île-de-France, dating to 1125, more than a century before the neighbouring Royaumont Abbey and Maubuisson Abbey. It was demolished and used for building stone in 1822 and 1845, leaving it mostly in ruins, though some of its buildings survive, including its dormitories and one gallery of its cloister. The monks' building was classed as a historical monument in 1947, as were the other buildings in 1965.

Bibliography
Marcel Aubert, "L'Abbaye du Val", Congrès archéologique de France, Paris, Société archéologique de France / A. Picard, vol. 103 « 103e session tenue en Île-de-France en 1944 », 1945, p. 111-117

1125 establishments in Europe
1120s establishments in France
Cistercian monasteries in France
Monasteries in Île-de-France
Buildings and structures in Val-d'Oise